The 2019 Copa del Rey Juvenil is the 69th staging of the Copa del Rey Juvenil de Fútbol. The competition started on May 18, 2019.

First round

The top two teams from each group of the 2018–19 División de Honor Juvenil de Fútbol and the two best third-placed teams were drawn into a two-game best aggregate score series. The first leg was played on May 18 and 19 and the second on May 25 and 26.

|}

Quarterfinals

The eight winners from the first round advanced to quarterfinals, that were played in a two-game series. The first leg were played on June 1 and 2 and the second on June 8 and 9.

|}

Semifinals

The four winners from the quarterfinals advanced to semifinals, that are played in a two-game series. The first leg was played on June 16 and the second leg will be played on June 23.

|}

Final

|}

See also
2018–19 División de Honor Juvenil de Fútbol

References

Copa del Rey Juvenil de Fútbol
Juvenil